Lepturges cingillus is a species of beetle in the family Cerambycidae. It was described by Monné in 1978.

References

Lepturges
Beetles described in 1978